Lee Dae-Hoon (Hangul: 이대훈; ; born February 5, 1992) is a South Korean taekwondo athlete. He won a bronze medal in the 2016 Summer Olympics and a silver in the 2012 Summer Olympics. He has achieved world first level rankings in the under 68 kg weight class.

Career
Lee grew up practicing martial art at his father's taekwondo academy from age 5.

He won the gold medal at the 2010 Asian Games, and repeated the feat at the 2014 Asian Games in Incheon.

Originally a bantamweight (under 63 kg), Lee temporarily went down in weight to flyweight (under 58 kg) after the 2011 World Championships in order to compete in the 2012 Olympics, where there were only four weight classes. Lee made his international flyweight debut at the 2011 World Taekwondo Olympic Qualification Tournament in Baku, Azerbaijan where he had his first international loss to 2008 Olympic silver medalist Gabriel Mercedes 14–12 in the semifinals. In May 2012, however, he captured his first flyweight gold medal at the 2012 Asian Taekwondo Championships, beating reigning Asian flyweight champion Pen-Ek Karaket 8–4 in the final bout. At the 2016 Summer Olympics Lee won a bronze medal, beating Jaouad Achab from Belgium 11–7. In 2016 WTF World Taekwondo Grand-Prix, Lee won gold against Konstantin Minin.

Lee's father, Lee Joo-Yeol, used to run his own taekwondo academy.

In 2022, Lee was appointed as a speaker at the 2022 Asian Games in Hangzhou and the 2024 Olympic Games by broadcasting on MBC.

Filmography

Television shows

References

External links

 Guangzhou 2010 profile
 

1992 births
Living people
South Korean male taekwondo practitioners
Asian Games medalists in taekwondo
Taekwondo practitioners at the 2012 Summer Olympics
Taekwondo practitioners at the 2016 Summer Olympics
Olympic silver medalists for South Korea
Olympic bronze medalists for South Korea
Olympic medalists in taekwondo
Olympic taekwondo practitioners of South Korea
Taekwondo practitioners at the 2010 Asian Games
Medalists at the 2012 Summer Olympics
Medalists at the 2016 Summer Olympics
Taekwondo practitioners at the 2014 Asian Games
Asian Games gold medalists for South Korea
Medalists at the 2010 Asian Games
Medalists at the 2014 Asian Games
Taekwondo practitioners at the 2018 Asian Games
Medalists at the 2018 Asian Games
World Taekwondo Championships medalists
Asian Taekwondo Championships medalists
Taekwondo practitioners at the 2020 Summer Olympics
Sportspeople from Seoul
21st-century South Korean people